Sudie is an unincorporated community in Paulding County, Georgia, United States, located at the crossroads of Hiram Sudie Road and Villa Rica Highway.

References

Unincorporated communities in Paulding County, Georgia
Unincorporated communities in Georgia (U.S. state)